Fancy is the surname of:

 John Fancy (1913–2008), British Second World War airman and prisoner of war whose escapes inspired the book and film The Great Escape
 Richard Fancy (born 1943), American actor
 Stuart Fancy (born 1959), British chess FIDE Master who competes for Papua New Guinean
 Arthur Fancy, a character on the TV series NYPD Blue